Antony Lopez (born 14 February 1987) is a Gibraltarian professional darts player who plays in Professional Darts Corporation (PDC) events.

A policeman on Gibraltar, Lopez has qualified for the six most recent editions of the Gibraltar Darts Trophy, only winning one game, against another Gibraltarian in John Duo.

Lopez made his debut of the 2019 World Cup, with Dyson Parody and losing to the decider leg 4–5 to Seigo Asada & Haruki Muramatsu to Japan.

References

External links

1987 births
Living people
Gibraltarian darts players
Professional Darts Corporation associate players
PDC World Cup of Darts Gibraltarian team